DOS'46 (Door Oefening Sterk 1946) is a Dutch korfball club located in Nijeveen, Netherlands. The club was founded on 22 May 1946 and they play their home games in Sporthal de Eendracht. The team plays in red shirts and black shorts / skirts.

History

The first historical moment for DOS'46 was winning the Dutch indoor title on 20 March 1982, after winning 10-8 against Deetos. In 2006, 2007 and 2009 the title is won in the Korfbal League. In 1982, 2007, 2008 and 2010 the club also wins the IKF Europa Korfball Cup.

Current squad

Squad for the 2015-16 season - Updated: 1 April 2016

Women
 11  Iris Hulzebosch
 12  Geertje Hoekstra
 13  Maaike Steenbergen
 14  Rosemiek Harrewijn
 15  Nynke Sinnema
 16  Nienke Hintzbergen
 17  Marieke Klaver
 19  Loes Blacquiere
 20  Lisanne Koster
 24  Fenna de Jong

Men
 1  Marco Zegwaard
 2  Sven Jonker
 4  Leander Zwolle
 5  Max Malestein
 6  Jelmer Jonker
 7  Jeffrey van Doeselaar
 8  Jesse de Jong
 9  Harjan Visscher
 10  Rick Wessel
 22  Bastiaan Nijmeijer

References

External links
 DOS'46 Official website

Korfball teams in the Netherlands